Association Sportive et Culturelle Sonelec (sometimes referred to as ASC Sonelec) is a Mauritanean football club based in the capital city of Nouakchott. The club plays in the Mauritanean Second Division.

In 1995 the team has won the Mauritanean Premier League , their only title.  The club also has two national cup titles which were won for two consecutive seasons in 1997 and 1998.

The club is currently playing in the National Second Division in the Special Zone and was 5th of the 2014/15 season.

After winning their only championship title ASC Sonalec was to challenge Boavista Praia from Cape Verde in the southwest, the tournament was abandoned and was out of the African Cup of Champions Clubs.  This was Sonalec's only appearance, one of a few clubs in what is now the CAF Champions League that has never scored a goal and have never played a match.

Stadium
Currently the team plays at the 10,000 capacity Stade Olympique (Nouakchott).

Honours
Mauritanean Premier League
Champion (1): 1995

Coupe du Président de la République
Winner (2): 1997, 1998

Performance in CAF competitions
CAF Champions League: 1 appearance
1996 African Cup of Champions Clubs – First Round
 Boavista FC, tournament abandoned, Boavista succeeded to the first round, club lost to Boavista

References

External links

Football clubs in Mauritania
Sport in Nouakchott